Salvia absconditiflora is a perennial plant species of the family Lamiaceae. It is endemic to Turkey.

It contains Salvinorin A at a concentration of 51.5 micrograms per gram of plant material.

References

absconditiflora
Flora of Turkey